George Albert of Brandenburg (20 November 1591, in Berlin – 29 November 1615, in Sonnenburg, present-day Słońsk), was Margrave of Brandenburg as George Albert II.

Life 
George Albert was a member of the House of Hohenzollern.  He was a son of the Elector John George of Brandenburg (1525–1598) from his third marriage to Elisabeth (1563–1607), daughter of Prince Joachim Ernest of Anhalt.

In 1614, he succeeded as Grand Master (Herrenmeister) of the Order of Saint John (Johanniterorden), seated at Sonnenburg, which his older brother Frederick had headed until his own early death.  After an agreement with Electoral Brandenburg, George Albert received a fief from Duke Philipp Julius of Pomerania. In 1615, he confirmed the privileges of the city of Sulęcin (.

George Albert died of smallpox at the age of 24 and was buried in the parish church of Küstrin.  His motto was:  ("My acts and my life are devoted to God").

Footnotes

References and source 
 Johann Samuel Ersch: Allgemeine Encyclopädie der Wissenschaften und Künste, J. f. Gleditsch, 1842, p. 429 (Digitized)
 Samuel Buchholtz: Versuch einer Geschichte der Churmarck Brandenburg von der ersten Erscheinung der deutschen Sennonen an bis auf jezige Zeiten, vols 3–4, F. W. Birnstiel, 1767, p. 490

House of Hohenzollern
1591 births
1615 deaths
Margraves of Brandenburg
17th-century German people
Sons of monarchs